Krestyanskaya Zastava is a Moscow Metro station in the Yuzhnoportovy District, Central Administrative Okrug, Moscow. It is on the Lyublinsko-Dmitrovskaya Line, between Rimskaya and Dubrovka stations. Krestyanskaya Zastava was opened on 28 December 1995 as part of the first stage of the Lyublinsky Radius.

Like its neighbour Rimskaya the station lacks an underplatform service areas and rests on a monolithic plate. At a depth of 47 metres the station is tri-vault wall-columned (i.e. the intercolumned space has been filled up to give extra strength). The architects Nikolay Shumakov and Nataliya Shurygina applied a Peasant Labour theme to the decoration which included a bright marble and aluminium  layout of the station and decorative mosaics at the ends of the columns (artists N.Andronov and Yu.Shishkov). The floor is covered in checkered pattern of black and grey granite and the lighting is hidden in the niches of the vault.

The station has one vestibule which is inter-linked with subways under the square for which the station is named. In 1997 a transfer was opened between the vestibule and the Proletarskaya station of the Tagansko-Krasnopresnenskaya Line.

External links
 Metro.ru
 Mosmetro.ru
 mymetro.ru
 News.Metro.ru
 KartaMetro.info — Station location and exits on Moscow map (English/Russian)

Moscow Metro stations
Railway stations in Russia opened in 1995
Lyublinsko-Dmitrovskaya Line
Railway stations located underground in Russia